The Ontario Court of Justice is the provincial court of record for the Canadian province of Ontario. The court sits at more than 200 locations across the province and oversees matters relating to family law, criminal law, and provincial offences.

Jurisdiction 
This court is subordinate in relationship to the "superior" courts. The phrase "provincial court" or "territorial court" is often used to mean a lower court whose decisions can be reviewed by a superior court. Decades ago, they were managed at the local municipal level.

The Ontario Court of Justice is a division of the Court of Ontario. The other division of the Court of Ontario is the Superior Court of Justice. Until 1999, the Ontario Court of Justice was known as the Ontario Court (Provincial Division).

Family law 

Family law cases deal with matters of custody, access and support, child protection so long as these are not incidental of or were not previously a part of a divorce application. Cases are heard by a judge only. Appeals from these cases are heard by the Superior Court of Justice.

Criminal law 

The Court deals with approximately 95% of criminal charges laid within the province and has responsibility for other matters pertaining to criminal law, including authorizing search warrants, bail hearings, and peace bonds, under sections 515 and 810 of the Criminal Code, respectively.

Criminal law cases heard before the Court are summary conviction offences, less serious indictable offences under section 553 of the Criminal Code, and indictable offences where the defendant has elected to have his or her trial heard in the Ontario Court of Justice (excluding offences found under section 469 of the Criminal Code - murder, treason, etc.).  Criminal cases are heard by a judge only. Appeals from cases involving summary conviction offences are heard by the Superior Court of Justice. Appeals involving indictable matters are heard by the Ontario Court of Appeal.

Criminal law matters before the Court also include remand or bail hearings and peace bonds.  These matters are not required to be heard by a judge and may be dealt with by a justice of the peace.  An appeal of a bail decision (bail review) must be heard by the Superior Court of Justice.

Structure of the Court 
Section 35 of the Courts of Justice Act sets out the structure of the Ontario Court of Justice.

Provincial judges

Provincial judges are appointed, as considered necessary, by the Lieutenant Governor in Council on the recommendation of the attorney general.  A person cannot be appointed as a provincial judge unless he or she has:

(a) been a member of the bar of one of the provinces or territories of Canada for at least 10 years; or

(b) has for an aggregate of 10 years,

(i) been a member of a bar mentioned in clause (a), and

(ii) after becoming a member of such a bar, exercised powers and performed duties of a judicial nature on a full-time basis in respect to a position held under a law of Canada or of one of its provinces or territories.

The normal age of retirement for a provincial judge is age 65, however there are exceptions that allow a provincial judge to continue in office until age 75, at which point they are required to retire without exception.

Judicial Appointments Advisory CommitteeThe Judicial Appointments Advisory Committee is responsible for finding suitable candidates for appointment as a judge of the Ontario Court of Justice. Only persons recommended by the Committee may be appointed. Appointments are made by the Lieutenant Governor in Council, on the recommendation of the Attorney General of Ontario. The Committee is currently composed of 13 members.
Current members consist of:
 Rachel Curran, Chair
 Justice Jeanine LeRoy, Regional Senior Justice, London
 Justice Lise S. Parent, Brampton
 Justice Riun Shandler, Toronto
 Edward Langley
 Geewadin Elliott
 Holly Haire
 Scott Munnoch
 Trevor Townsend
 Karen Vogt
 Gerald Chan (Law Society of Ontario)
 Kavita Bhagat (Ontario Bar Association)
 Cheryl Siran (Federation of Ontario Law Associations)

Chief Justice

The Lieutenant Governor in Council may, on the recommendation of the attorney general, appoint a provincial justice to the position of Chief Justice of the Ontario Court of Justice. The Chief Justice is the President of the Ontario Court of Justice. They are responsible for directing and supervising the sittings of the Court throughout Ontario and for assigning its judicial duties. If the Chief Justice is absent from Ontario or is for any reason unable to act, his or her powers and duties shall be exercised and performed by an associate chief justice of the Ontario Court of Justice designated by the Chief Justice. A Chief Justice has a single term of office of eight years, but will nonetheless continue in office until a successor is appointed, up to a total term of nine years.

Associate Chief Justice

The Lieutenant Governor in Council may, on the recommendation of the attorney general, appoint provincial justices to the positions of Associate Chief Justice and Associate Chief Justice-Coordinator of Justices of the Peace of the Ontario Court of Justice for single terms of six years. The Associate Chief Justice and the Associate Chief Justice-Coordinator of Justices of the Peace provide support to the Chief Justice and have specific delegated responsibilities as well as those set out in statute. The Associate Chief Justice-Coordinator of Justices of the Peace administers the Ontario Native Justice of the Peace Program. Within the Court, the principal responsibility for this program falls to the Senior Justice of the Peace/Administrator of the Ontario Native Justice of the Peace Program. The stated goal of the program is to encourage and enable Aboriginal Canadians to play a greater role in decision-making in the administration of justice, by serving as justices of the peace, particularly in areas of the province with significant Aboriginal population.

Regional Senior Justice

Ontario is divided into seven geographic regions for judicial administration: northwest, northeast, west, central west, central east, east, and Toronto. Each region has a regional senior judge and a regional senior justice of the peace. The Lieutenant Governor in Council may, on the recommendation of the attorney general, appoint a provincial justice to the position of regional senior justice for a term of three years. The responsibilities of a regional senior judge are to exercise the same powers and functions as the Chief Justice of the Ontario Court of Justice in his or her region, subject to their authority. A regional senior justice also assists in the supervision of the justices of the peace within that region. This is done in consultation with the Associate Chief Justice-Coordinator of Justices of the Peace and the regional senior justice of the peace.

Regions

Current justices 
The current Chief Justice of the Ontario Court of Justice is Lise Maisonneuve, whose term began on May 2, 2015.

One of the two Associate Chief Justices of the Ontario Court of Justice is Aston J. Hall, whose term began on June 3, 2021.

The second of the two Associate Chief Justices of the Ontario Court of Justice, who is also the Coordinator of Justices of the Peace, is Sharon M. Nicklas, whose term began on September 2, 2019.

Each judicial region has its own Regional Senior Justice:

Central East Region: Esther Rosenberg (starting June 1, 2018)

Central West Region: Paul R. Currie (starting August 31, 2019)

East Region: W. Vincent Clifford (starting September 25, 2020)

Northeast Region: Karen L. Lische (starting June 4, 2021)

Northwest Region: David M. Gibson (starting June 12, 2021)

Toronto Region: Sandra Bacchus (starting June 3, 2021)

West Region: Jeanine E. LeRoy (starting February 1, 2019)

The Ontario Court of Justice maintains a full list of all current judges and justices of the peace of the court on its website.

Fired Justices of the Peace
 John Guthrie (2019)
 Tom Foulds (2018)
 Errol Massiah (2015)
 Donna Phillips (2013)

See also 
 Courts of Ontario

References

External links
 Ontario Court of Justice website
 Ontario Courts website
 List of Judges of the Court of Justice
 OCJ Biennial Report 2008-2009 archived

Ontario courts
Ontario
1996 establishments in Ontario
Courts and tribunals established in 1996